William Banks-Blaney is a fashion expert and designer of 25 dresses. He was the original founder and CEO of vintage brand, WilliamVintage, before he stepped down from his position in 2017. He has been referred to as "The Vintage King" by Vogue, Harper's Bazaar, The Times, The Telegraph, The Independent, and The New York Times.

Education and Charitable Work
During his time as CEO of WilliamVintage, Banks-Blaney was a visiting Fellow at the London College of Fashion, a guest lecturer at The Condé Nast College of Fashion & Design, Style Ambassador to American Express, and a lecturer at the Victoria and Albert Museum and the Fashion and Textile Museum in Bermondsey, south London. He was also a Fashion Patron of Oxfam creating masterclasses shown on Vogue.com, and directed a campaign with Guy Aroch which featured in the national press, in advertising and in Oxfam stores nationwide.

Publishing

In September 2013, Quadrille Publishing announced it had signed Banks-Blaney for his first book 25 Dresses, a hardback book focusing on the evolution of women's fashion and the legacy of haute couture in the 21st century, which first launched in March 2015. The book was formally launched at the Hay Festival of Literature and Arts in May 2015.

Personal life
Banks-Blaney had a previous relationship with Gregory Barker, the former UK Climate Change Minister. In October 2006 it was announced Barker had left his wife for Banks-Blaney amid intense media scrutiny upon them both.

Banks-Blaney's lawyers, Carter-Ruck, soon issued a statement that ‘William Banks-Blaney has won substantial damages from the publishers of the Evening Standard and The Sun over false allegations which 'impugned his integrity' and the newspapers printed subsequent apologies.

References

1973 births
Living people
People educated at Aylesbury Grammar School
Alumni of the University of East Anglia
Alumni of the University of Buckingham